Andrea Errico (born 1 January 1999) is an Italian professional footballer who plays as a midfielder.

Club career
Born in Rome, Errico started his career with Frosinone.

In 2019, he was loaned to Serie C club Viterbese. Enrrico made his professional debut on 25 August 2019 against Paganese.

For the 2020–21 season, he was loaned to Avellino.

On 9 July 2021, he was loaned again to Viterbese. On 13 January 2022, he moved on a new loan to Monterosi.

International career
On 12 November 2019, Errico was called for Italy U20. He made his debut on 18 November against Switzerland.

References

External links
 

1999 births
Living people
Footballers from Rome
Italian footballers
Association football midfielders
Serie C players
Frosinone Calcio players
U.S. Avellino 1912 players
U.S. Viterbese 1908 players
Monterosi Tuscia F.C. players
Italy youth international footballers